SS Vaderland was an ocean liner launched in July 1900 for the Red Star Line service between Antwerp and New York. During her passenger career, the ship initially sailed under British registry, but was re-registered in Antwerp in 1903.

After the beginning of the First World War, Vaderland was re-registered in Liverpool and converted to a troopship, ferrying troops of the Canadian Expeditionary Force from Halifax to Liverpool. While under the operation of White Star–Dominion in 1915, she was renamed Southland to avoid the German-sounding Vaderland.

In September 1915, Southland was torpedoed in the Aegean Sea by German submarine  with the loss of 40 men. The ship was beached, repaired, and returned to service in August 1916.

Early career 
In July 1899, the Red Star Line announced plans for the construction of four large steamers. Owned by American Line and managed by International Navigation Co. Ltd. London, she was 11,899 gross register tons, and after modification provided accommodation for 342 first-class, 194 second-class, and 626 third-class passengers.

Launched on 12 July 1900, Vaderland began her maiden voyage on 8 December 1900 when she left Antwerp for Southampton and New York City. She was chartered to the American Line and made three  -Southampton – Cherbourg – New York round-trip voyages between 11 December 1901 and 8 April 1902. On 16 May 1903 she commenced Antwerp – New York service under the Belgian flag, starting her last on 25 December 1914. During this service, she collided with the 43-gross register tonnage American schooner John A. Allen off Georges Bank between the North Atlantic Ocean and the Gulf of Maine on 22 July 1906; John A. Allen was lost, but all seven people aboard her survived. On 19 January 1907 she collided with the British steamer Naworth Castle in the English Channel off the Goodwin Sands; Naworth Castle sank. Forty-two members of the 1912 United States Olympic Team returned from Stockholm, Sweden, to New York City aboard Vaderland on 31 July 1912.

On 22 September 1914 Vaderland commenced Liverpool – New York sailings under the British flag and in December 1914 was chartered to White Star–Dominion for three Liverpool - Halifax - Portland sailings. In 1915 she was requisitioned as a troopship. In 1915 she was renamed Southland as the Dutch word vaderland was considered too similar to the German Vaterland.

Mediterranean and first torpedo attack 

Southland was later used in the Mediterranean to carry troops of the 6th Essex regiment and two companies of l/7th Essex, transported from Devonport to Gallipoli from 4 July 1915 to 11 August 1915, and later from Alexandria, the Australian 21st Battalion with some troops from the Australian 23rd Battalion, General Legge and staff and 2nd Division Signals Company. During its sail from Egypt to Gallipoli on the 2 September 1915 at 9:45am it was torpedoed at right forward by the German submarine   from Lemnos in the Aegean Sea. During the subsequent rescue operations Ben-my-Chree took on board 649 troops and 121 crew from 21 boats and rafts and provided medical attention as required until all were transferred to the troopship  in Mudros harbour.

The sinking was reported as "A Splendid story is told of the sinking of the transport Southland in the Mediterranean Sea. When the torpedo struck the vessel reeled and the order was given to abandon the ship. There was never a cry or sign of fear. The Australian soldiers merely came briskly on deck singing 'Australia Will Be There.'

The troops all went to their stations and lowered the boats in an orderly manner. The subalterns searched the interior of the ship for wounded and finally came on deck to find only the general staff on board. They helped to lower the last boats and got into a half swamped one themselves. Fourteen persons were killed by the explosion and twenty two were drowned including Brigadier General Linton."the commander of the 6th Brigade, Colonel R. Linton 

A record of this event is recorded in the war diary of Captain Herbert Franklin Curnow:"Thursday 2 September	
Up 6am.  Drew 120 rounds of ammunition and iron and landing rations. Pulled into Lemnos and dropped anchor about 10am.  The Military Landing Officer came on board, got my disembarkation return and meantime informed us that the Southland having on board 2 Aus Div H.Q 6th Inf Bge  HQ., 21 Bt 1 Coy 23rd Btn. some A.S.C. A.M.C. & Signalling details had been torpedoed behind us.  Later ascertained about 25 lives lost including Col Linton, Brigadier.  Turned in soon after dinner."

However, a member of Australian unit reported one crew shot for behaving improperly. The remaining men and ship's crew were able to get to the Allied vessels later the same day. HMT Southland carried James Martin whose experiences, and those of his friend Cecil Hogan, were described in a book by Anthony Hill.

The sinking was depicted in the painting Sinking of the Southland by Fred Leist, who was appointed an official war artist in September 1917, and attached to the 5th Division AIF. Colonel Linton is buried in East Murdos Military Cemetery on the Greek island of Lemnos.

North Atlantic and second torpedo attack 

Notes

References 
 
 
  (Convenience copy located at The Matthews and Reeves Families.)

Further reading 
 
 
Men of the Southland - the first Australian Troopship to be Torpedoed (Discovering Anzacs)

Ships built on the River Clyde
Passenger ships of the United Kingdom
Passenger ships of Belgium
World War I passenger ships of the United Kingdom
Troop ships of the United Kingdom
Ships sunk by German submarines in World War I
World War I shipwrecks in the Atlantic Ocean
1900 ships
Maritime incidents in 1906
Maritime incidents in 1907
Maritime incidents in 1915
Maritime incidents in 1917